Jack Houghton Roscoe (28 January 1906 – 1969) was an English footballer who played as a centre forward in the Football League for Oldham Athletic and Chester. He also played in non-league football for Werneth Athletic, Witton Albion, Mossley (two spells), Macclesfield Town and Hyde United.

References

1906 births
1969 deaths
Footballers from Oldham
English footballers
Association football forwards
Witton Albion F.C. players
Mossley A.F.C. players
Oldham Athletic A.F.C. players
Chester City F.C. players
Macclesfield Town F.C. players
Hyde United F.C. players
English Football League players